John Scott (born 28 September 1954) is a former rugby union international who represented England from 1978 to 1984.

Early life
John Scott was born on 28 September 1954 in Exeter.

Rugby career

International record
Debut: Saturday 21/1/78 –v- France (Paris) lost 15–6 (FN) (Aged: 23)
Final appearance: 9/6/1984 –v- South Africa (Johannesburg) lost 35–9
Career Record: P34, W13, D3, L18.  Tries: 1  Test Points: 4
English Caps 1978–84
1978	France	(Paris)	              L	15 –  6	
1978	Wales	(Twickenham)	      L	 9 –  6	
1978	Scotland (Murrayfield)	      W	15 –  0	
1978	Ireland	(Twickenham)	      W	15 –  9	
1978	New Zealand (Twickenham)      L	16 –  6	
1979	Scotland (R) (Twickenham)     D 7 –  7	
1979	Ireland	(Dublin)	      L	12 –  7	
1979	France	(Twickenham)	      W	 7 –  6	
1979	Wales	(Cardiff)	      L	27 –  3	
1979	New Zealand (Twickenham)      L	10 –  9	
1980	Ireland	(Twickenham)	      W	24 –  9	
1980	France	(Paris)	              W	17 – 13	
1980	Wales	(Twickenham)	      W	 9 –  8	
1980	Scotland (Murrayfield)	      W	30 – 18	
1981	Wales	(Cardiff)	      L	21 – 19	
1981	Scotland (Twickenham)	      W	23 – 17	
1981	Ireland	(Dublin)	      W	10 –  6	
1981	France	(Twickenham)	      L	16 – 12	
1981	Argentina (Buenos Aires)      D	19 – 19	
1981	Argentina (Buenos Aires)      W	12 –  6	
1982	Ireland	(Twickenham)	      L	16 – 15	
1982	France	(Paris) 	      W	27 – 15	
1982	Wales	(Twickenham)	      W	17 –  7	
1983	France	(Twickenham)	      L	19 – 15	
1983	Wales	(Cardiff)	      D	13 – 13	
1983	Scotland (Twickenham)	      L	22 – 12	
1983	Ireland	(Dublin)	      L	25 – 15	
1983	New Zealand (Twickenham)      W	15 –  9	
1984	Scotland (Murrayfield)	      L	18 –  6	
1984	Ireland	(Twickenham)	      W	12 –  9	
1984	France 	(Paris)               L	32 – 18	
1984	Wales	(Twickenham)	      L	24 – 15	
1984	South Africa (Port Elizabeth) L	33 – 15	
1984	South Africa (Johannesburg)   L	35 –  9	
(R) = Replacement

Family and later life
Married to Oonagh, they have two children, Liam and Gemma. Scott is currently director of an embroidery company in Bessemer Road, Cardiff.

References

1954 births
Living people
Cardiff RFC players
England international rugby union players
English rugby union players
Rugby union number eights
Rugby union players from Exeter